Jamie Taylor (born 16 December 1982) is an English footballer who plays for Broadbridge Heath as a striker.

Career
Born in Crawley, West Sussex, Taylor played for Broadbridge Heath, scoring 17 times during the 2000–01 season, before moving to Horsham at the start of the 2001–02 season. In November 2001 he scored 9 times in three matches, all within 12 days. He moved to Aldershot Town in August 2002.

He struggled to establish himself with Aldershot and had a number of loan spells with other clubs, including Horsham in February 2003, and Carshalton Athletic in December 2003, before being released in February 2004. He joined AFC Wimbledon in March 2004, helping them gain promotion to the Isthmian First Division, before returning to Horsham in October the same year.

In the 2006, Taylor joined Woking and in March 2007 he joined Dagenham & Redbridge. With Dagenham promoted to the football league at the end of the season, Taylor made his league debut on 18 August 2007 as a second-half substitute for Chris Moore in the 2–2 draw at home to Wycombe Wanderers.

On 22 February 2008, Taylor joined Grays Athletic on loan for a month, which was later extended until the end of the 2007–08 season. Taylor scored nine goals in 16 appearances for the Blues, finishing as second top goal scorer to Danny Kedwell.

Following his impressive loan spell at Grays Athletic, he was offered a two-year contract at the start of the 2008–09 season.

Taylor signed for fellow Conference National outfit Eastbourne Borough on 10 July 2009. He was voted the Supporters & Players' Player of the Year for the 2010–11 season. However, he turned down a new deal with the club following their drop in division.

Taylor signed for Lincoln City on a two-year deal on 1 July 2011. After an injury hit first season, Taylor helped the Imps survive in the Conference Premier in a difficult 2012–13 season, finishing as top scorer. At the end of his contract, Taylor left to return to his native South Coast.

In August 2018, he joined Three Bridges before, in January 2019, returning to Broadbridge Heath who he had first joined when just fifteen years old.

References

External links

1982 births
Living people
Sportspeople from Crawley
Footballers from West Sussex
English footballers
Association football forwards
Broadbridge Heath F.C. players
Horsham F.C. players
Aldershot Town F.C. players
Carshalton Athletic F.C. players
AFC Wimbledon players
Woking F.C. players
Dagenham & Redbridge F.C. players
Grays Athletic F.C. players
Eastbourne Borough F.C. players
Lincoln City F.C. players
Sutton United F.C. players
Margate F.C. players
Three Bridges F.C. players
Isthmian League players
National League (English football) players
English Football League players